Euchlaenidia erconvalda is a moth of the family Erebidae. It was described by Schaus in 1933. It is found in Bolivia.

References

Euchlaenidia
Moths described in 1933